The men's heptathlon event at the 2017 European Athletics Indoor Championships were held on March 4–5, 2017.

Medalists

Records

Results

60 metres

Long jump

Shot put

High jump

60 metres hurdles

Pole vault

1000 metres

Final results

References

Combined events at the European Athletics Indoor Championships
2017 European Athletics Indoor Championships